North English may refer to:

North English, Iowa, a city in the United States.
The Northern England dialect and accent of the English language.